Charles St John Wallace Furneaux (born 1957) is a British television producer and documentary maker. He began his career as an assistant producer with the BBC, becoming a commissioning editor at Channel 4 in 1994. Furneaux then went to Talkback Thames in 2003 as Head of Specialist Factual and Documentaries resigning in 2007 to manage his own production company, Kaboom Film & TV.

Career
Award-winning productions of Furneaux include The Natural History of the Chicken, which won an Emmy Award in the category of Outstanding Science and Nature Programming-Long Form in 2002. Touching the Void won BAFTA's 2004 Alexander Korda award for the outstanding British film of the year. The Shooting of Thomas Hurndall, in 2009, won two BAFTA Awards and one Monte Carlo Golden Nymph Award, and the documentary Treblinka: Inside Hitler's Secret Death Camp won a Cine Golden Eagle Award in the History category of the Televised Documentary & Performance Division in 2014. Furneaux also produced Diana: In Her Own Words, which broadcast on 6 August 2017 and became Channel 4's "most-watched documentary since 2014", peaking with 4.1 million viewers.

Personal life
Furneaux read modern history at Durham University (University College), graduating with a 2:1 degree in 1978.

Furneaux is a former participant in the Up series, an ongoing documentary series which follows the lives of fourteen British citizens in seven-year intervals, beginning when they were seven years old in 1964. Furneaux declined to participate in the series after the 21 Up episode, broadcast in 1977. After Charles declined to appear in 28 Up, during a subsequent phone conversation, director Michael Apted, by his own admission, "went berserk", which destroyed the relationship to the degree that Charles has refused to participate in all subsequent films. Allison Pearson, writing for The Telegraph, reports that Apted alleged Furneaux had filed a lawsuit aimed at "remov[ing] Charles' likeness from the archive sequences in 49 Up".

Furneaux has also participated in one of the original television series in which a viewer was encouraged to voice their opinions regarding current television programmes, Right to Reply, in 1998.

Filmography

Television

References

Further reading and viewing
 List of production credits for Furneaux from the BFI

Living people
British television producers
1957 births
Alumni of University College, Durham
Equinox (TV series)